Dinamo-Juni Minsk was a Belarusian football club based in Minsk.

History
The club was founded in 1993 as an outfit for Dinamo Minsk Academy graduates, and served as the team's farm club. After two seasons in Belarusian Second League they were promoted to the First League in 1995. After finishing in relegation zone in 2004, the club was folded.

Performance by season
{|class="wikitable"
|-bgcolor="#efefef"
! Season
! League
! Pos.
! Pl.
! W
! D
! L
! GS
! GA
! P
!Cup
!Notes
!    Manager
|-
|1993–94
|bgcolor=#98bb98|3D
|align=right|9
|align=right|34||align=right|13||align=right|10||align=right|11
|align=right|50||align=right|41||align=right|36
|
|
|
|-
|1994–95
|bgcolor=#98bb98|3D – A
|align=right bgcolor=silver|2
|align=right|22||align=right|14||align=right|7||align=right|1
|align=right|54||align=right|11||align=right|35
|Last 16
|Won Promotion Playoffs
|
|-
|1995
|bgcolor=#ffa07a|2D
|align=right|12
|align=right|14||align=right|4||align=right|2||align=right|8
|align=right|12||align=right|22||align=right|14
|
|
|
|-
|1996
|bgcolor=#ffa07a|2D
|align=right|6
|align=right|24||align=right|9||align=right|7||align=right|8
|align=right|27||align=right|26||align=right|34
|Last 16
|
|
|-
|1997
|bgcolor=#ffa07a|2D
|align=right|9
|align=right|30||align=right|12||align=right|7||align=right|11
|align=right|45||align=right|42||align=right|43
|Last 16
|
|
|-
|1998
|bgcolor=#ffa07a|2D
|align=right|4
|align=right|30||align=right|17||align=right|5||align=right|8
|align=right|61||align=right|36||align=right|56
|Last 32
|
|
|-
|1999
|bgcolor=#ffa07a|2D
|align=right bgcolor=#cc9966|3
|align=right|30||align=right|16||align=right|8||align=right|6
|align=right|50||align=right|36||align=right|56
|Last 32
|
|
|-
|2000
|bgcolor=#ffa07a|2D
|align=right|11
|align=right|30||align=right|11||align=right|5||align=right|14
|align=right|44||align=right|47||align=right|38
|
|
|
|-
|2001
|bgcolor=#ffa07a|2D
|align=right|13
|align=right|28||align=right|6||align=right|7||align=right|15
|align=right|19||align=right|39||align=right|25
|
|
|
|-
|2002
|bgcolor=#ffa07a|2D
|align=right|9
|align=right|30||align=right|11||align=right|1||align=right|18
|align=right|40||align=right|47||align=right|34
|
|
|
|-
|2003
|bgcolor=#ffa07a|2D
|align=right|12
|align=right|30||align=right|7||align=right|6||align=right|17
|align=right|27||align=right|60||align=right|27
|
|
|
|-
|2004
|bgcolor=#ffa07a|2D
|align=right|16
|align=right|30||align=right|6||align=right|3||align=right|21
|align=right|27||align=right|55||align=right|21
|
|Relegated
|
|-
|}

References

External links
Profile at footballfacts.ru

Defunct football clubs in Belarus
Football clubs in Minsk
FC Dinamo Minsk
Association football clubs established in 1993
Association football clubs disestablished in 2004
1993 establishments in Belarus
2004 disestablishments in Belarus